Cock-Cornelius House, also known as Wyckoff-Underhill House, is a historic home located at Locust Valley in Nassau County, New York.  It is a 1- to -story, "U" shaped wood-frame dwelling sheathed in wood shingles.  The main block is  stories and five bays wide.  The oldest section of the house is dated to the Federal period, about 1790.  The house was expanded in the 1840s and in the 1920s-1930s.

It was listed on the National Register of Historic Places in 2006.

References

Houses on the National Register of Historic Places in New York (state)
Federal architecture in New York (state)
Houses completed in 1790
Houses in Nassau County, New York
National Register of Historic Places in Oyster Bay (town), New York